Hans im Glück is a German board and card game publisher. Though many of their own games are language-independent they themselves publish only printings for the domestic market which include only German-language rules; English-language printings of their games have been published primarily by Rio Grande Games, Dutch versions by 999 Games and so on.

They are named after a story recorded by the Brothers Grimm, called "Hans in Luck" or "Lucky Hans" in English, hence the logo of Hans riding a pig.

Notable games
 Die Macher (1986)
 1835 (1990)
 Modern Art (1992)
 El Grande (1995)
 Tigris and Euphrates (1997)
 Samurai (1998)
 Carcassonne (2000)
 Amun-Re (2003)
 Saint Petersburg (2004)
 Fjords (2005)
 Thurn and Taxis (2006)
 Stone Age (2008)
 Dominion (2009)
 The palaces of Carrara (2012)
 Russian Railroads (2014)
 The voyages of Marco Polo (2015)
 Stone Age Junior (2016)

References

External links
 Hans im Glück's home page 
 

Board game publishing companies